Super Bock Super Rock is a music festival in Portugal that takes place annually since 1995. It is organized by the Portuguese live entertainment company Música no Coração and is named after its main sponsor, the beer brand Super Bock.

Over the years, the festival has had various formats, locations and focus on music genres. It is currently held during a weekend in July at the Herdade do Cabeço da Flauta, close to the Meco beach, in Sesimbra.

History 
Super Bock Super Rock started as a two-day festival in July 1995, held at the Gare Marítima de Alcântara in Lisbon. The next two editions were held at the Passeio Marítimo de Algés. In 1998 it was held during the Expo '98 fair in Lisbon, at the Praça Sony.

In 1999, in its fifth edition, the format of the festival was changed: it became a 10-day event in 3 different cities, in closed venues. The concerts were held at the Coliseu dos Recreios, Aula Magna and Paradise Garage in Lisbon, the Coliseu do Porto in Porto and the Hard Club in Vila Nova de Gaia. This festival format and locations were kept for the following two editions. In 2000, it was held between 3 and 15 March. In 2001, the festival went on for 30 days.

In 2002, Super Bock Super Rock expanded its locations to Spain. The eight edition was held in Lisbon, Porto, Vila Nova de Gaia, Coimbra and Vigo (Spain). The ninth edition, in 2003, expanded the numbers of locations even further by including concerts in Évora and Madrid (Spain). One of the highlights of this edition were the sold-out concerts by Coldplay in Lisbon and Madrid. Marilyn Manson, Deftones, Audioslave and Primitive Reason performed in Lisbon. 

In 2004, Super Bock Super Rock returned to the open-air festival format, held at the Parque Tejo, in Lisbon. It continued to be organized in Parque Tejo until 2008.

In 2008 the festival was split between a location in Lisbon, Parque Tejo, and another in Porto, the Estádio do Bessa. The format was repeated in 2009, with Estádio do Restelo being the chosen location in Lisbon. 

In 2010, Super Bock Super Rock moved for the first time to a non-urban location, settling at the Herdade do Cabeço da Flauta, near the Meco Beach, in Sesimbra – about 25 km to the south of Lisbon. It provided a camping area. It remained in this location for 5 editions. 

In 2015, the festival returned to the urban environment in Lisbon, being held in Parque das Nações. The main stage was at the MEO Arena. It remained in this location for 4 editions. 

Since 2019 Super Rock Super Rock is once again organized at the Herdade do Cabeço da Flauta.

The 26th edition of Super Bock Super Rock was scheduled to take place on 16, 17 and 18 July 2020, at the Herdade do Cabeço da Flauta. On 15 May 2020, Música no Coração announced that the 26th edition would be postponed to 2021 due to the Portuguese government's decision to prohibit all large-scale events in the country until 30 September 2020, amid the COVID-19 pandemic. 

The 26th edition was then planned to take place between 15 and 17 July 2021, in the same location, with all tickets bought for the 2020 edition still valid for the new dates. On 31 May 2021, Música do Coração once again announced the postponement of the festival, justifying the decision with the disruption in international travel still in effect due to the COVID-19 pandemic, which forced many of the scheduled international artists to postpone their tours to 2022.

Editions

References

External links
Official website
Música no Coração official website

Culture in Lisbon
Music festivals established in 1994
Rock festivals in Portugal
Tourist attractions in Lisbon
1994 establishments in Portugal
Annual events in Portugal
Summer events in Portugal